Luis de la Cruz (born 23 March 1991) is a Paraguay international footballer who plays for Club Olimpia as a right back or left back.

Club career
de la Cruz has played club football for Guarani.

International career
He was called up to the senior Paraguay squad in September 2015 for a match against Chile.

References

1991 births
Living people
Club Guaraní players
Club Olimpia footballers
Paraguayan Primera División players
Paraguayan footballers
Association football defenders